Johannes Jürna (30 June 1895 Rapla Parish, Harrien County – 13 March 1930 Tallinn) was an Estonian politician. He was a member of II Riigikogu. He was a member of the Riigikogu since 3 April 1924, representing the Workers' United Front. He replaced Anton Mangman. Working as an underground organizer of the Communist Party of Estonia, Jürna was shot by the Estonian security police on 13 March 1930 in Tallinn while resisting arrest.

References

1895 births
1930 deaths
People from Rapla Parish
People from Kreis Harrien
Russian Social Democratic Labour Party members
Old Bolsheviks
Workers' United Front politicians
Communist Party of Estonia politicians
Members of the Riigikogu, 1923–1926
Deaths by firearm in Estonia